Geodermatophilus tzadiensis is a Gram-positive, aerobic and UV radiation-resistant bacterium from the genus Geodermatophilus which has been isolated from desert sand near Ouré Cassoni in Chad.

References

Bacteria described in 2013
Actinomycetia